Sinocyclocheilus wui is an Asian freshwater species of ray-finned fish in the genus Sinocyclocheilus. It is benthopelagic, and is found in China.

References 

wui
Fish described in 2013